The Rijksmuseum van Natuurlijke Historie (National Museum of Natural History) was a museum on the Rapenburg in Leiden, the Netherlands. It was founded in 1820 by Royal Decree from a merger of several existing collections. This happened on the initiative of Coenraad Jacob Temminck, who saw the museum primarily as a research institute for the University of Leiden. The total collection was already quite large at the time, and continued to grow from foreign expeditions and by obtaining private collections from inheritances. The location is currently used by the Rijksmuseum van Oudheden.

History

The location was originally a hofje called Hof van Zessen. In 1815 plans were made to build a museum there (the first building called a "museum" in Leiden). It opened in 1820, and until 1913, the museum normally opened to the public on Sundays. In 1913, the museum moved to a new building, with very little room available for exhibits, and in 1950, this room was also closed. After that, there were a few opportunities for guided tours, attending lectures, and temporary exhibitions.

In 1976, a paper, "Towards a New Museum", was produced. This led to the museum taking on more of a central curating role, lending pieces from its collection to other museums. The Rijksmuseum van Natuurlijke Historie and the Rijksmuseum van Geologie en Mineralogie merged in 1984. A permanent public exhibition was still not present. That came in 1986, when the so-called "National Presentation" in the field of natural history was commissioned by the Dutch government. Planning began for a new building, which was completed in 1990 and launched in 1998 as "Naturalis".

Buildings and interior

Former Directors
 Coenraad Jacob Temminck 1820 - 1858
 Hermann Schlegel 1858 - 1884
 Fredericus Anna Jentink 1884 - 1913
 Eduard Daniel van Oort 1913 - 1933
 Hilbrand Boschma 1933 - 1958
 Leo Brongersma 1958 - 1972
 Willem Vervoort 1972 - 1982
 Jacobus Theodorus Wiebes 1982 - 1989
 T. de Caluwé (?) 1989 - 1991
 W. van der Weiden 1991 - 2003

Contributing scientists
 Marinus Boeseman
 Heinrich Boie
 Johann Büttikofer
 Rudolf van Eecke
 Berend George Escher
 Matthijs Freudenthal 
 Otto Finsch
 Agatha Gijzen
 Wilhem de Haan
 James Edmund Harting
 Koos den Hartog
 Jan Adrianus Herklots
 Lipke Holthuis
 Johan Coenraad van Hasselt
 George Junge
 Heinrich Kuhl
 Jacob van der Land
 Heinrich Christian Macklot
 Johannes Govertus de Man
 Karl Martin
 Gerlof Fokko Mees
 Salomon Müller
 Dirk Noordam
 Coenraad Ritsema
 Willem Roelofs
 Adolph Cornelis van Bruggen
 Jacobus van der Vecht
 Samuel Constantinus Snellen van Vollenhoven
 G. van der Zanden

Contributing artists
 John Gerrard Keulemans
 Marinus Adrianus Koekkoek the Younger
 Joseph Smit
 Joseph Wolf

Contributing to collections
 Pieter Bleeker
 Eugène Dubois
 Curt Eisner
 Oliver Erichson Janson
Franz Wilhelm Junghuhn
 Thure Kumlien
 Pierre Millière
 Hendrik Pel
 Walter Karl Johann Roepke
 Hermann von Rosenberg
 Gerard van Rossem
 Philipp Franz von Siebold
 Hermanus Gerardus Maria Teunissen
 François Le Vaillant

Varia
Stephen Jay Gould depicts his visit to the Raamsteeg building in Dinosaur in a Haystack in his essay "Four Antelopes of the Apocalypse".

See also
Scripta Geologica
Zoologische Mededelingen
Zoologische Verhandelingen

References

Museums disestablished in 1984
Defunct museums in the Netherlands
Museums established in 1820
National museums of the Netherlands
Natural history museums in the Netherlands
Museums in Leiden
1820 establishments in the Netherlands
Rijksmonuments in Leiden
Science and technology in the Netherlands
19th-century architecture in the Netherlands